Atrocalopteryx melli is a species of broad-winged damselfly in the family Calopterygidae.

The IUCN conservation status of Atrocalopteryx melli is "LC", least concern, with no immediate threat to the species' survival. The IUCN status was reviewed in 2018.

References

Further reading

 

Calopterygidae
Articles created by Qbugbot
Insects described in 1912